Vedran Babić (born 1 August 1983 in Pula, Croatia) is a former Croatian team handball player is currently head coach of Swiss club HC Romanshorn.

Honours
Bosna Sarajevo
Handball Championship of Bosnia and Herzegovina (1): 2009-10
Handball Cup of Bosnia and Herzegovina (1): 2010

References

External links
EHF Profile
RK Zamet Profile

1983 births
Living people
Sportspeople from Pula
Handball players from Rijeka
RK Zamet players
Croatian male handball players
Croatian handball coaches
Croatian expatriate sportspeople in Bosnia and Herzegovina
Croatian expatriate sportspeople in Austria
Croatian expatriate sportspeople in Switzerland